Matt Graham is an American comedian and Scrabble expert who has represented the United States in international competition. He was the 1997 World Scrabble Championship runner-up. Originally from Indiana, Graham lives in Queens, New York. In the late 1980s, Graham shared a Boston apartment with Marc Maron and David Cross

Graham was featured prominently in the 2001 book Word Freak and in the 2004 documentary film Word Wars. As a stand-up comedian, he appeared several times on Late Night with Conan O'Brien. Graham worked briefly on one season as writer on Saturday Night Live, but was fired by head writer Colin Quinn after not having much of his material included in the show. He also wrote for Late Night with Conan O'Brien, Chain Reaction, and Grand Slam. Graham performed his show This Too Shall Suck at the 2012 FringeNYC Festival.

References

External links
Profile on wscgames.com
NSA Profile

This Too Shall Suck website

American Scrabble players
Living people
American male comedians
21st-century American comedians
Place of birth missing (living people)
Year of birth missing (living people)